Garston Dock railway station served Garston, Liverpool, Merseyside, England and Garston Docks. It was situated on the east side of Dock Road.

History 
The station opened on 1 July 1852 as the western terminal of the St Helens and Runcorn Gap Railway and closed 16 June 1947. Soon after the station was opened the Garston and Liverpool Railway was opened bringing the St Helens Railway Liverpool terminus to Brunswick. However the Cheshire Lines Committee took over this line to connect in Liverpool to Manchester Line to central Liverpool. So the LNWR which by this time had acquired the St Helens Railway built Hunts Cross chord allowing its trains to access its Liverpool Lime Street railway station.

References

See also
Garston railway station (Merseyside)
Garston and Liverpool Railway

Disused railway stations in Liverpool
Railway stations in Great Britain opened in 1852
Railway stations in Great Britain closed in 1917
Railway stations in Great Britain opened in 1919
Railway stations in Great Britain closed in 1947
Former London and North Western Railway stations
1852 establishments in England